Friedrich Emanuel Marx (27 September 1767 – 25 May 1826) was a German organ builder in Berlin.

Life 
Born in Berlin, Marx was named as an organ builder from about 1790 under his father Ernst Julius Marx, whose workshop in Berlin he took over after his death in 1799.
Spectacular was the construction of a zinc pipe organ with a cast-iron case by Karl Friedrich Schinkel in Hohenofen in the Prignitz, which, however, had to be dismantled again after protests by the organ critic Friedrich Wilke.

Friedrich Emanuel Marx was married to Caroline Louisa Wiebe, the daughter of an innkeeper from Nauen. His son Carl Friedrich Ernst Marx also became an organ builder in Berlin, but no works by him are known.

Marx died in Berlin at the age of 58.

List of works (selection) 
Several new organs are known to have been built by Friedrich Marx in the Mark Brandenburg and in Schwerin, as well as rebuilds and repairs. Parts of the organs in Groß Kreutz, Lüdersdorf and Biesen have survived. Instruments that no longer exist are set in italics.

New Organ Buildings

Other works
 1802 Spandau, Johanniskirche, repair of the Johann Wilhelm Grüneberg organ from 1783, today in Französischer Kirche in Potsdam.

References

Further reading 
 Wolf Bergelt: Orgelreisen durch die Mark Brandenburg. 3rd edition. Freimut & Selbst, Berlin 2016. 
 Friedrich Emanuel Marx. In Uwe Pape, Wolfram Hackel, Christhard Kirchner (ed.): Lexikon norddeutscher Orgelbauer. Volume 4. Berlin, Brandenburg und Umgebung. Pape Verlag, Berlin 2017.

External links 
 Orgelbauer Institut für Orgelforschung

German pipe organ builders
1767 births
1826 deaths
People from Berlin